Vitănești (Purani until 1996) is a commune in Teleorman County, Muntenia, Romania. It is composed of four villages: Purani, Schitu Poienari, Siliștea, and Vitănești.

The commune is crossed by the 44th parallel north.

Notable residents include the philosopher and writer Constantin Noica (1909–1987).

References

Communes in Teleorman County
Localities in Muntenia